Universal is the fourth studio album from Norwegian black metal band Troll.

Track listing

"Intro: My Sulphur Lover" - 4:53
"Rex Lamictal" - 4:33
"Sannhetens Plagiat" - 3:59
"President Besters Alimony" - 3:48
"Intermission 666" - 4:25
"Entering the Fluid Oxygen" - 3:35
"Color of Evil" - 3:35
"Fields of a New Sun" - 2:43
"Outro: Please the Pain" - 4:20

Personnel

Sinister Minister Twice - vocals
Notorious Nagash (Stian Arnesen, a.k.a. Lex Icon) - guitars, music
Amon-D (a.k.a. Blackheart, Psy Coma)- synth, programming
Sensei Ursus Major - bass
Mr. Hellhammer - drums
Neon Heart, Inc. - mastering

2001 albums
Troll (Norwegian band) albums